Indra Malla (Nepali: इन्द्र मल्ल) was a Malla dynasty king and the King of Patan. He succeeded Loka Prakash Malla and reigned from 1706 until his death in 1709.

Life 
Indra Malla was the nephew of Yoganarendra Malla through his sister Manimati and thus a grandson of Srinivasa Malla. After the death of Yoganarendra, the local lords of Patan installed Lokaprakash Malla, the grandson of Yoganarendra. But Lokaprakash died the same year and Indra Malla succeeded him. He was a religious monarch and donated various items to religious places. 

He died in 1709 and was succeeded by Vira Narasimha Malla.

References 

18th-century Nepalese people
Nepalese monarchs
1709 deaths